The Battle of Fehmarn was a battle took place on 24 April 1715, during the Great Northern War. It was a victory for a Danish squadron under Gabel, which captured five of the six Swedish ships under Wachtmeister at the cost of 65 dead and 224 wounded.

Ships involved

Denmark (Gabel)
Prinds Christian 76
Prinds Carl 54
Prinds Wilhelm 54
Delmenhorst 50
Fyen 50
Island 50
Laaland 50
Højenhald 30
Raae 34
Løvendals Gallej 20
3 small
1 fireship

Sweden (Wachtmeister)
Nordstjerna 76 - Aground, captured next day
Princessa Hedvig Sophia 76 - Aground, captured next day and later scuttled
Södermanland 56 - Aground, captured next day
Göteborg 50 - Aground, captured next day
Hvita Örn 30 - Captured
Falk 26 - Aground, captured next day

References

Fehmarn 1715
Fehmarn
1715 in Denmark